The Neota Wilderness is administered by the USDA Forest Service. It is located on the Canyon Lakes Ranger District of the Roosevelt National Forest in Colorado. This wilderness area encompasses  and is bordered on the south by Rocky Mountain National Park. There are only  of trail in this area.

References

IUCN Category Ib
Protected areas of Larimer County, Colorado
Wilderness areas of Colorado
Protected areas established in 1980
Roosevelt National Forest
1980 establishments in Colorado